Me & My Guitar is an album by American guitarist Tony Rice, released in 1986.

Track listing 
 "Me and My Guitar" (James Taylor) – 3:55  
 "Four Strong Winds" (Ian Tyson) – 4:00  
 "Walls" (Gordon Lightfoot) – 1:58  
 "Greenlight on the Southern" (Norman Blake) – 3:24  
 "Port Tobacco" (Tony Rice) – 4:45  
 "Early Morning Rain" (Lightfoot) – 3:02  
 "Sixteen Miles" (Lightfoot) – 2:39  
 "Hard Love" (Bob Franke) – 4:19  
 "Tipper" (Rice) – 3:36  
 "Song for a Winter's Night" (Lightfoot) – 3:08  
 "Sweetheart Like You" (Bob Dylan) – 4:28  
 "Fine as Fine Can Be" (Lightfoot) – 3:23

Personnel 
 Tony Rice – guitar, vocals
 Vassar Clements – violin, background vocals
 Jerry Douglas – dobro
 Wyatt Rice – guitar
 Bill Wolf – piano
 Todd Phillips – bass
 Larry Atamanuik – drums, percussion
 Cole Burgess – saxophone
 Sam Bush – mandolin
 Bob "Barbecue Bob" Hicks – fiddle, harmony vocals
 Kathy Chiavola – harmony vocals
 Jimmy Gaudreau – mandolin, harmony vocals
 Mark Schatz – bass, background vocals
Production notes:
 Tony Rice – producer
 Bill Wolf – producer, engineer, mixing, mastering
 George Horn – mastering

References 

1986 albums
Tony Rice albums
Rounder Records albums